Hemistomia aquilonaris is a species of minute freshwater snail with an operculum, an aquatic gastropod mollusc or micromollusc in the family Tateidae. This species is endemic to a single spring in Vallee des Palmiers, Ouehat, Koumac, in the north of New Caledonia.

See also
List of non-marine molluscs of New Caledonia

References

aquilonaris
Endemic fauna of New Caledonia
Gastropods described in 1998
Freshwater molluscs of Oceania